Soundarya Rajinikanth  (born Shaku Bai Rao Gaikwad; 20 September 1984) is an Indian graphic designer, film producer and director who primarily works in the Tamil film industry. She is the founder and owner of Ocher Picture Productions. Soundarya began her career in films as a graphic designer. For those starring her father Rajinikanth, she designed the title sequences. She became a film producer with Goa (2010). She made her debut as a director with the film Kochadaiyaan (2014).

Career
Soundarya Rajinikanth, born as Shaku Bai Rao Gaikwad did her childhood education in the Ashram Matriculation Higher Secondary School in Velachery, Chennai.

In 2007, Ocher Studios signed an agreement with Warner Bros Entertainment to partner up in producing and distributing Tamil films. Her directorial debut was supposed to be Sultan: The Warrior, a 3D animated film featuring her father Rajinikanth. Despite heavy pre-production promotion, including a teaser of the film and an interactive website, the film was dropped. She instead directed Kochadaiiyaan, India's first motion capture film, with Rajinikanth in the lead role. Through Kochadaiiyaan, Soundarya earned the distinction of becoming the first woman to direct her father in a feature film. At the NDTV Indian of the Year awards 2014, she was honoured for "Technical Innovation In Film".

In 2016, she worked on the pre-production of a film titled Nilavukku Enmel Ennadi Kobam with Dhanush, Kajal Aggarwal and Manjima Mohan, but the film was later dropped. Her next directorial venture was Velaiilla Pattadhari 2, shot in Tamil and Telugu languages.

In 2019, She started a production company called May 6 Entertainment. She founded Hoote, a social media platform that is based on voice messages.

Personal life
Soundarya is the younger daughter of actor Rajinikanth and his wife Latha. She has one elder sister, Aishwarya Rajinikanth. 

Soundarya married Ashwin Ramkumar, an industrialist, on 3 September 2010 at Rani Meyyammai Hall in Chennai. The couple has a son born on 6 May 2015. In September 2016, Soundarya revealed that she and her husband had filed for divorce by mutual consent due to irreconcilable differences. In July 2017, the couple officially divorced. 

She married Vishagan Vanangamudi, an actor and businessman, on 11 February 2019 at Leela Palace in Chennai. Their son "Veer" was born in 2022.

Filmography

Web series

References

External links

Living people
Indian women film producers
Tamil film producers
Film directors from Chennai
Indian women film directors
Tamil film directors
1984 births
Indian women designers
21st-century Indian designers
Pseudonymous artists
Film producers from Chennai
21st-century Indian film directors
21st-century Indian women artists
Women artists from Tamil Nadu
Businesswomen from Tamil Nadu
20th-century Indian businesswomen
20th-century Indian businesspeople
21st-century Indian businesswomen
21st-century Indian businesspeople